Where Angels Fear is an original novel by Rebecca Levene and Simon Winstone  featuring the fictional archaeologist Bernice Summerfield. The New Adventures were a spin-off from the long-running British science fiction television series Doctor Who.

Levene had been editor of the New Adventures for some years, with Winstone latterly her deputy and then her successor. Where Angels Fear was commissioned as Levene handed over to Winstone and it sets up a story arc that ran through to the final New Adventure, Twilight of the Gods.

Synopsis
Bernice's home planet of Dellah, once a place of learning, is being overrun by a new religious movement. Closer investigation reveals the major powers of the universe are literally running in fear from said movement.

1998 novels
1998 science fiction novels
Virgin New Adventures